The city of Batum (now Batumi) in modern-day Georgia issued revenue stamps in 1918 while under British occupation. A set of 7 from 20k to 30R was originally issued, and this was later overprinted BRITISH OCCUPATION. The 20k was later also surcharged 20 руб., for 20 rubles.

See also
Postage stamps of Batum under British occupation

References

Batumi
Batum
Economy of Georgia (country)